Rabbi Refael Shapiro (1837–1921) was the famed Rosh Yeshiva of the Volozhin yeshiva located in the town of Volozhin, Russia, (now Valozhyn, Belarus), and a son-in-law of Rabbi Naftali Zvi Yehuda Berlin (the Netziv). After the Volozhin yeshiva was closed down in 1892 by order of the Russian government, he reopened it, albeit on a smaller scale in 1899. He was the father-in-law of Rabbi Chaim Soloveichik of Brisk, now in Belarus, and is known as the Toras Refael after his primary work.

Rabbi Shapiro ordained Rabbi Isser Yehuda Unterman (who would eventually become one of Israel's chief rabbis) who studied in the Kollel of the Volozhin yeshiva before opening his own yeshiva in the neighboring town of Vishnyeva (Vishnevo, Belarus). Additionally, Rabbi Shapiro gave Semicha (rabbinical ordination) to Rabbi Moshe Shatzkes, known as the Łomża Rov, and Rabbi Meir Joshua Rosenberg.

Rabbi Shapiro died on the 23rd of the Jewish month of Adar in 1921.

References

Family tree

1837 births
1921 deaths
Belarusian Orthodox rabbis
Rosh yeshivas
19th-century rabbis from the Russian Empire
20th-century Russian rabbis